Algaza is a rural locality (a selo) in Bakhtemirsky Selsoviet of Ikryaninsky District, Astrakhan Oblast, Russia. The population was 480 as of 2010. There are 5 streets.

Geography 
Algaza is located 17 km northeast of Ikryanoye (the district's administrative centre) by road. Krasnye Barrikady is the nearest rural locality.

References 

Rural localities in Ikryaninsky District